Patrícia Rehder Galvão, known by her pseudonym Pagu (1910-1962) was a Brazilian writer.

Pagu may also refer to:
 Eternamente Pagú, a film about Patrícia Rehder Galvão
 PAGU, an acronym of Projektions-AG Union, a German film company
 Pagu language of Indonesia
 Pågu, the historical settlement at Pago Bay, Guam
 Cadernos Pagu, a Brazilian academic journal